Elmer Frank Kolberg (January 21, 1916 – September 30, 1994) was an American football halfback, center, fullback and end in the National Football League (NFL).  He played for the Philadelphia Eagles and the Pittsburgh Steelers.

Kolberg was born in Orange, California. His family moved to Portland, Oregon in 1923. In high school, he was three-time all-league selection in both football and basketball.

He played both college football and basketball at Oregon State. He was an aggressive player who set a conference record for most individual personal fouls in a single basketball season. He was named basketball All-Coast at guard for the Beavers. In football, he was named to the west team for the East–West Shrine Game in 1938.

Kolberg served in the Navy during World War II. After the war he worked as a real estate appraiser.

Kolberg was married in the summer of 1941. He is a member of the Portland Interscholastic League (high school) Hall of Fame.

References

1916 births
1994 deaths
American football running backs
American football wide receivers
Oregon State Beavers men's basketball players
Oregon State Beavers football players
Philadelphia Eagles players
Pittsburgh Steelers players
United States Navy personnel of World War II
Sportspeople from Orange, California
Players of American football from Portland, Oregon
Lincoln High School (Portland, Oregon) alumni
American men's basketball players
Guards (basketball)
Wilmington Clippers players